Rott Abbey was a Benedictine monastery in Rott am Inn in Bavaria, Germany.

History
The monastery, dedicated to Saints Marinus and Anianus, was founded in the late 11th century by Count Kuno of Rott (d. 1086).

After it was dissolved in 1803 in the secularisation of Bavaria, the buildings were sold off to various private owners and largely demolished. The Rococo church however still remains.

Burials
Ignaz Günther

References

External links
 HDBG: Kloster Rott 
 Rott am Inn official website: pictures of the church interior 
 Photos of the interior of the Abbey Church, in the Warburg Institute Iconographic Database: interior of the abbey church

Christian monasteries established in the 11th century
Benedictine monasteries in Germany
Monasteries in Bavaria
1803 disestablishments
Buildings and structures in Rosenheim (district)